Murita Storey (born September 14, 1995) is an American professional soccer player who plays as a center midfielder for Israeli Football club, Hapoel Petah Tikva F.C. (women).

Career 
Murita Storey started her career as a soccer player at a young age in the clubs of her city.

She was scouted by Campbell University.

Young career
 2013–2017: Campbell University Women's Team, Buies Creek (United States)

Professional career
 2017–2020: Club Deportivo Parquesol, Valladolid (Spain)
 2020: Lorca Féminas Asociación Deportiva, Lorca (Spain)
 2021: Joventut Almassora CF,  Almassora (Spain)
 2021-2022: C.D. Getafe Femenino., Getafe (Spain)
 2022-: FF Yzeure Allier Auvergne, Yzeure (France)
 2022-: Hapoel Petah Tikva F.C. (women), Petah Tikva (Israel)

Personal life 
Murita Storey is fluent in English, Spanish, and French

Honors 
 Top 11 of the season 2021-2022
 Top 11 of the season 2019-2020

References

External links
 Murita Storey - Women's Soccer

1995 births
Living people
Women's association football midfielders
American women's soccer players
American expatriate women's soccer players
Ligat Nashim players
Division 2 Féminine players
Expatriate footballers in Israel
Expatriate footballers in France
American expatriate sportspeople in Israel
American expatriate sportspeople in France